Wang Wentao (born May 1964) is a Chinese politician who has been Minister of Commerce since December 2020. He formerly served as Communist Party Secretary of Jinan and Deputy Party Secretary of Shandong province.

Career
Wang was born in 1964 in Nantong, Jiangsu province. He attended Fudan University in Shanghai, graduating with a degree in philosophy.  He joined the Chinese Communist Party (CCP) in December 1994.  After graduation he worked as an instructor at career institute of the Shanghai Academy of Spaceflight Technology; he also served as the head of the Communist Youth League organization at the institute, as well as the managing the sales of photocopying machines. He was later transferred to work as mayor of the town of Wuku in the Songjiang District, then promoted to party chief of Liugang. Then he served as deputy governor of Songjiang District in Shanghai and head of urban planning; he was also in charge of industrial development, the technology park, and export growth. 

In January 2005, Wang was then transferred to Kunming to become deputy party chief, then mayor. Then he was transferred back to Shanghai to serve as deputy party chief and later governor of Huangpu District. In April 2011 he was named a provincial Party Standing Committee member of Jiangxi and party chief of the provincial capital Nanchang.

In March 2015, Wang was named Party Secretary of Jinan and joined the Shandong Shengwei Changwei; he replaced Wang Min, who was dismissed for corruption. In April 2017, Wang was named deputy party chief of Shandong. On 26 March 2018, he was appointed acting Governor of Heilongjiang province, replacing Lu Hao. He was confirmed as Governor on 15 May. Wang was appointed Minister of Commerce in December 2020.

Wang has been an alternate member of the 18th and the 19th Central Committees of the CCP.

References 

1964 births
Living people
People's Republic of China politicians from Jiangsu
Chinese Communist Party politicians from Jiangsu
Political office-holders in Shandong
Politicians from Nantong
Fudan University alumni
Alternate members of the 18th Central Committee of the Chinese Communist Party
Alternate members of the 19th Central Committee of the Chinese Communist Party
Ministers of Commerce of the People's Republic of China
Governors of Heilongjiang
Political office-holders in Shanghai
Political office-holders in Yunnan
Political office-holders in Jiangxi